CFS3 may refer to:

 Fort Selkirk Aerodrome, which has a TC LID CFS3
 Combat Flight Simulator 3: Battle for Europe